Nariman Cristina Battikha Yanyi (born March 29, 1995) is a Venezuelan model, economist and beauty pageant titleholder who was crowned as Reina Hispanoamericana 2018. In addition, she also represented Portuguesa state in Miss Venezuela 2017, where she finished as one of the semifinalists.

On the other hand, Battikha was Miss Supranational Venezuela 2018 and represented Venezuela in the Miss Supranational 2018 competition, managing to position herself within the Top 10.

Life and career

Early life
Battikha was born in Maturín, Monagas, she comes from a Syrian family dedicated to the business world; and also has Lebanese descent. When she finished his high school studies, she decided to settle in the United States to learn English. Nariman obtained a degree in Business Economics from the Metropolitan University in Caracas. His name 'Narinam' is of Egyptian origin and means "the name of faith".

Pageantry
Nariman began in the world of beauty contests by participating in the Sambil Model Venezuela 2015, together with 11 other participants. On June 2, 2015, the eleventh edition of said contest would be held, where the winner was Isabella Rodriguez.

Miss Venezuela 2017 
In 2017, she joined the ranks of Miss Venezuela, managing to represent the Portuguesa state. Battikha obtained the special award of Miss Glamor, and was also a finalist for the Miss Health & Esthetic band, obtained by Miss Delta Amacuro, Sthefany Gutiérrez; this helped Battikha to become one of the great favorites of that edition.

On November 9, 2017, the sixty-fourth edition of Miss Venezuela was held at the Venevisión studios, where Battikha managed to position herself as one of the 10 semifinalists.

Reina Hispanoamericana 2018 
After having participated in the Miss Venezuela, Osmel Sousa designates Nariman as the Venezuelan representative in the Reina Hispanoamericana Pageant. On November 3, 2018, in Santa Cruz, Bolivia, Battikha was crowned by her predecessor, Teresita Marquez of the Philippines as the Reina Hispanoamericana 2018.

Miss Supranational Venezuela 2018 
In May 2018, Battikha was appointed as the representative of Venezuela towards the Miss Supranational 2018 competition, being prepared another again by Osmel Sousa.

Miss Supranational 2018 
Nariman represented Venezuela in the Miss Supranational 2018 pageant, which was held on December 7, 2018 at the Municipal Sports and Recreation Center MOSIR, in Malopolska, Krynica-Zdrój, Poland. Nariman obtained the Miss Photogenic Award, and got second place with number of votes for the Beautiful Piece of Jewelry and also with number of votes on Instagram for Photosoot with Raymond Saldana.

At the end of the event, Battikha qualified within the group of 10 semi-finalists.

References

External links
 

1995 births
Living people
Miss Venezuela winners
People from Maturín
Venezuelan female models